Waruna may be,

Waruna language

People
Waruna Lakshan
Waruna Shantha
Waruna Waragoda